The Geamăna oil field is an oil field located in Zemeș, Bacău County. It was discovered in 2000 and developed by Petrom. It began production in 2001 and produces oil.

References

Oil fields in Romania